Glamour Girl may refer to:

 Glamour Girl (1938 film), a 1938 British comedy film
 Glamour Girl (1948 film), a 1948 American film
 Glamour Girl (2000 film), a film starring Rohit Roy
 Glamour Girl (novel), a novel by Kerry Katona and Fanny Blake
 "Glamour Girl" (song), a song by Praga Khan
 Glamour girl, type of glamour photography

See also
 Glamour Gal, a 1945 propaganda film